Tisha is the debut and only studio album by American actress-singer Tisha Campbell, which was released in 1993 by Capitol/EMI Records. The album features the singles "Push" and "Love Me Down." Following its release, the album failed to chart on the Billboard 200 or Hot R&B Albums charts and peaked at number 37 on Billboard's Heatseekers.

Track listing

"Round 'n' Round" contains a sample from "N.E. Heartbreak" by New Edition.

Charts

Singles
 Push (1993)
 Love Me Down (1993)

References

External links
tishacampbell.com

1993 debut albums
Tisha Campbell-Martin albums
Capitol Records albums